The Poland women's national under–18 ice hockey team is the national under-18 ice hockey team of Poland. The team represents Poland at the International Ice Hockey Federation's World Women's U18 Division I Qualification.

World Women's U18 Championship record

* Including one win in extra time
^ Including one loss in extra time

Ice hockey
Women's national under-18 ice hockey teams